Versailles–Chantiers is the principal railway station serving the city of Versailles.  It provides national service on the Paris–Brest railway line, as well as regional, and commuter (Paris) rail service.

See also
 List of stations of the Paris RER

References

External links
 
 

Réseau Express Régional stations
Railway stations in Yvelines
Transport in Versailles
Railway stations in France opened in 1849
Gare de Versailles-Chantiers